Spondyloarthropathy or spondyloarthrosis refers to any joint disease of the vertebral column. As such, it is a class or category of diseases rather than a single, specific entity. It differs from spondylopathy, which is a disease of the vertebra itself, but many conditions involve both spondylopathy and spondyloarthropathy.

Spondyloarthropathy with inflammation is called axial spondyloarthritis. In the broadest sense, the term spondyloarthropathy includes joint involvement of vertebral column from any type of joint disease, including rheumatoid arthritis and osteoarthritis, but the term is often used for a specific group of disorders with certain common features, which are often specifically termed seronegative spondylarthropathies. They have an increased incidence of HLA-B27, as well as negative rheumatoid factor and ANA. Enthesopathy is also sometimes present in association with seronegative .

Non-vertebral signs and symptoms of degenerative or other not directly infected inflammation, in the manner of spondyloarthropathies, include asymmetric peripheral arthritis (which is distinct from rheumatoid arthritis), arthritis of the toe interphalangeal joints, sausage digits, Achilles tendinitis, plantar fasciitis, costochondritis, iritis, and mucocutaneous lesions. But lower back pain is the most common clinical presentation of the causes of spondyloarthropoathies; this back pain is unique because it decreases with activity.

Seronegative spondyloarthropathy
Seronegative spondyloarthropathy (or seronegative spondyloarthritis) is a group of diseases involving the axial skeleton and having a negative serostatus.

"Seronegative" refers to the fact that these diseases are negative for rheumatoid factor, indicating a different pathophysiological mechanism of disease than is commonly seen in rheumatoid arthritis.

Conditions
The following conditions are typically included in the group of seronegative spondylarthropathies:

Some sources also include Behçet's disease and Whipple's disease.

Common characteristics
These diseases have the following conditions in common:
 Seronegative (i.e. rheumatoid factor is not present)
 They are in relation to HLA-B27
 Inflammatory axial arthritis, generally sacroiliitis and spondylitis
 Oligoarthritis, generally with asymmetrical presentation
 Enthesitis (inflammation of the entheses, the sites where tendons or ligaments insert into the bone.), e.g. Plantar fasciitis, Achilles tendinitis, costochondritis.
 Familial aggregation occurs
 Extra-articular features, such as involvement of eyes (anterior uveitis), skin, genitourinary tract, and aortic regurgitation
 Overlap is likely between several of the causative conditions

Classification
Assessment of Spondylarthritis International Society (ASAS criteria) is used for classification of axial spondyloarthritis (to be applied for patients with back pain greater than or equal to 3 months and age of onset less than 45 years). It is of two broad types:
 Sacroiliitis on imaging plus 1 SpA feature, or
 HLA-B27 plus 2 other SpA features
Sacroiliitis on imaging:
 Active (acute) inflammation on MRI highly suggestive of SpA-associated sacroiliitis and/or
 Definite radiographic sacroiliitis
SpA features:
 Inflammatory back pain
 Arthritis
 Enthesitis
 Anterior uveitis
 Dactylitis
 Psoriasis
 Crohn's disease or ulcerative colitis
 Good response to NSAIDs
 Family history of SpA
 HLA-B27
 Elevated CRP

Treatment
Many patients have more than one of the spondyloarthritis disease manifestations. Some immunosuppressive drugs have shown efficacy in more than one of the diseases, e.g. tumor necrosis factor (TNF) inhibitors. But some of the immunosuppressive drugs are particularly effective for a specific inflamed tissue and approved in only one or two of the disease entities, so an interdisciplinary approach is required.

Epidemiology
Worldwide prevalence of spondyloarthropathy is approximately 1.9%.

References

External links 

Arthritis
Musculoskeletal disorders